Bacongo is one of the arrondissements or subdivisions of Brazzaville, the capital of Republic of Congo.  Inside of Bancongo, the  scenic Brazzaville Corniche starts and ends. The French Ambassador's house, also known as the Case de Gaulle, is also located in Bacongo. Bacongo is located on the coast of the Congo River with Kinshasa, the capital of the DRC.

References 

Geography of Brazzaville